This is a list of noted Ugandan writers,  born or raised in Uganda, whether living there or overseas, and writing in one of the languages of Uganda.

A
Adong Judith (born 1977), playwright
Grace Akello (born 1950), poet, essayist, folklorist and politician
Harriet Anena, short story writer, poet, journalist
Apolo Kagwa (1864–1927), prime minister of Buganda
Monica Arac de Nyeko (born 1979), short story writer, poet and essayist
Asiimwe Deborah GKashugi, playwright
Lillian Aujo, poet, short story writer

B
Doreen Baingana (born 1966), short story writer
Bake Robert Tumuhaise (born 1981), novelist
Evangeline Barongo, children's writer
Violet Barungi (born 1943), novelist and editor
Mildred Barya, poet
Jackee Budesta Batanda, short story writer, novelist
Austin Bukenya (born 1944), poet, literary theorist, actor and playwright 
Busingye Kabumba (born 1982), lawyer, poet
Bwesigye bwa Mwesigire (born 1987), lawyer, poet, short story writer
Ernest Bazanye, journalist, author

D-K
Dilman Dila (born 1977), novelist, short story writer, filmmaker
Angella Emurwon, playwright
Arthur Gakwandi (born 1943), novelist, academic, short story writer
Jessica horn-Uganda (born 1979), poet
Ife Piankhi, poet
Moses Isegawa (born 1963), novelist
Kabubi Herman, poet
Peter Kagayi, poet
Keturah Kamugasa (1967–2015), writer and journalist 
Catherine Samali Kavuma (born 1960), novelist
China Keitetsi (born 1967), autobiographical writer
Susan Nalugwa Kiguli (born 1969), poet, academic
Barbara Kimenye (1929–2012), children's writer 
Wycliffe Kiyingi (1929–2014), playwright
Henry Kyemba (born 1939), politician and writer
Goretti Kyomuhendo (born 1965), novelist

L-M
Beatrice Lamwaka, short story writer
Bonnie Lubega (born 1929), novelist, children's writer and lexicographer 
Lubwa p'Chong (1946–1997), playwright. 
Jennifer Nansubuga Makumbi, poet, novelist, short story writer
Irshad Manji (born 1968), author, professor and advocate 
Charles Mayiga (born 1962), lawyer, prime minister of Buganda (born 2013)
Rose Mbowa (1943–1999), playwright, actress and educator
Mutesa II of Buganda (1942–1969), Kabaka of Buganda
Christopher Henry Muwanga Barlow (1929–2006), poet
Mahmood Mamdani (born 1933), academic and political writer
Patrick Mangeni, academic and writer
Mulumba Ivan Matthias (born 1987), poet, short story writer, novelist

N-O
John Nagenda (1938–2023), writer and presidential adviser
Nakisanze Segawa, poet
Beverley Nambozo, poet, short story writer
Glaydha Namukasa, novelist
Philippa Namutebi Kabali-Kagwa (born 1964), poet
Peter Nazareth (born 1940), novelist, playwright, poet and critic 
Rajat Neogy (1938–1995), writer and editor
Jason Ntaro, poet
Richard Carl Ntiru (born 1946), poet 
Michael B. Nsimbi (1910–1994), Luganda writer
Nyana Kakoma, short story writer
Julius Ocwinyo (born 1961), editor, poet and novelist
James Munange Ogoola (born 1945), poet, judge
Okello Oculi (born 1942), novelist, poet and academic
Okot p'Bitek (1931–1982), poet 
Mary Karooro Okurut (born 1954), novelist, academic, politician
Charles Onyango-Obbo (born 1958), journalist

R–Z
John Ruganda (1941–2007), playwright
Andrew Rugasira, author, businessman
Rose Rwakasisi (born 1945), children's writer, short story writer
Eneriko Seruma (born 1944), poet, novelist and short story writer 
Robert Serumaga (1939–1980), playwright, director and novelist 
Taban Lo Liyong (born 1939), Sudan-born poet and critic 
Bahadur Tejani (born 1942), Kenyan-born poet, dramatist and literary critic 
Lillian Tindyebwa, novelist, short story writer
Tumusiime Rushedge (1941–2008), novelist, cartoonist, surgeon
Nick Twinamatsiko, engineer, novelist, poet
Hilda Twongyeirwe, editor, poet, short story writer
Ayeta Anne Wangusa (born 1971), activist, novelist, short story writer
Timothy Wangusa (born 1942), poet, novelist
Yoweri Museveni (born 1944), politician, president
Samuel Iga Zinunula, poet
Elvania Namukwaya Zirimu (1938–1979), poet, dramatist
Pio Zirimu (died 1977), linguist and literary theorist

See also
List of African writers by country

References

Uganda
Kumusha
 
Writers